Posyolok otdeleniya 2 sovkhoza Ust-Medveditsky is a rural locality (a settlement) in Peschanovskoye Rural Settlement, Serafimovichsky District, Volgograd Oblast, Russia. The population was 59 as of 2010. There are 5 streets.

Geography 
The settlement is located 75 km southwest of Serafimovich (the district's administrative centre) by road. Peschany is the nearest rural locality.

References 

Rural localities in Serafimovichsky District